Andrew Maury is an American record producer, mixing engineer, and songwriter based in Brooklyn, New York.

Career
Maury has worked with artists such as Lewis Del Mar, Lizzo, Ra Ra Riot, Shawn Mendes, JP Saxe, Post Malone, RAC, Jeremy Zucker, Madi Diaz, Kimbra, COIN, Colony House, The Kooks, Delicate Steve, Atlas Genius, Flor, Isaac Dunbar, and CRUISR. Andrew started his career in 2008 touring with Ra Ra Riot mixing front-of-house while producing / mixing artists between tours. In the summer of 2009, he worked on Tegan and Sara's Sainthood alongside producer and Death Cab for Cutie guitarist Chris Walla at the world-famous Sound City Studios in Los Angeles. Since 2013, Maury has focused on producing and mixing records.

Credits
{| class="wikitable"
! width="33"|Year
! width="230"|Album/Song
! width="200"|Artist
! width="100"|Credit
|-
|2022
|"Flowers"
|Lauren Spencer-Smith
|M
|-
|2022
|"When You're Gone"
|Shawn Mendes
|M
|-
|2022
|Shaking Hands With Elvis
|Allison Ponthier
|M
|-
|2021
|Rainbow Mixtape
|COIN
|M
|-
|2021
|History Of A Feeling
|Madi Diaz
|M
|-
|2021
|Dangerous Levels Of Introspective
|JP Saxe
|M
|-
|2021
|Grizfolk
|Grizfolk
|M
|-
|2020
|August
|Lewis Del Mar
|P, E, M
|-

|2020
|Everlasting
|Loyal Lobos
|M
|-
|2020
|"u n me but mostly me"
|ELIO
|M
|-
|2020
|"Crowd"
|Silver Sphere
|M
|-
|2020
|"always"
|Keshi
|M
|- 
|2020
|"Makeup Drawer"
|Isaac Dunbar
|M
|-
|2019
|"What A Shame"
|Leyla Blue
|M
|-
|2019
|Table Of Context
|Cautious Clay
|MA
|-
|2019
|Ley Lines
|Flor
|M
|-
|2019
|"Jerome"
|Lizzo
|M
|-
|2019
|"Drunk On A Rhythm"
|Gothic Tropic
|M
|-
|2019
|Till I Burn Up
|Delicate Steve
|M
|-
| rowspan="1" align="center" |2018
|Shawn Mendes
|Shawn Mendes
|M
|-
|align="center" rowspan="1"|2018
|"Ooh Lordy"
|Youngr
|M
|-
|2017
|come out you're hiding
|Flor
|M
|-
|align="center" rowspan="1"|2017
|glisten
|Jeremy Zucker
|M
|-
| rowspan="1" |2017
|idle
|Jeremy Zucker
|M
|-
|align="center" rowspan="1"|2017
|"There's Nothing Holdin' Me Back"
|Shawn Mendes
|P, M
|-
|align="center" rowspan="1"|2017
|How Will You Know If You Never Try
|COIN
|P, M
|-
|align="center" rowspan="1"|2016
|"Broken Whiskey Glass", "Leave"
|Post Malone
|M
|-
|align="center" rowspan="1"|2016
|Lewis Del Mar
|Lewis Del Mar
|P, E, M
|-
|align="center" rowspan="1"|2016
|"Sweet Relief"
|Kimbra
|P, M
|-
|align="center" rowspan="1"|2015
|Cascades
|High Highs
|P, E, M
|-
|align="center" rowspan="1"|2016
|EP
|Lewis Del Mar
|P, E, M
|-
|align="center" rowspan="1"|2015
|Into Focus EP
|Panama Wedding
|P, E, M
|-
|align="center" rowspan="1"|2015
|Inanimate Objects
|Atlas Genius
|M (9 tracks)
|-
|align="center" rowspan="1"|2015
|Use Your Time Wisely
|Strange Names
|P, E, M
|-
|align="center" rowspan="1"|2015
|Lost In New York
|Penguin Prison
|M (9 Tracks)
|-
|align="center" rowspan="1"|2015
|Rest In Paradise
|Kisses
|P, M
|-
|align="center" rowspan="1"|2015
|"Go For It" Single
|CRUISR
|P, E, M
|-
|align="center" rowspan="1"|2015
|Live In Las Vegas
|Delicate Steve
|M
|-
|align="center" rowspan="1"|2015
|Karl Kling
|Karl Kling
|M
|-
|align="center" rowspan="1"|2015
|COIN
|COIN
|M (4 tracks)
|-
|align="center" rowspan="1"|2014
|Sadie
|Astronauts, etc.
|M
|-
|align="center" rowspan="1"|2014
|All Over
|CRUISR
|P, E, M
|-
|align="center" rowspan="1"|2014
|Parallel Play
|Panama Wedding
|P, E, M
|-
|align="center" rowspan="1"|2014
|Strangers
|RAC
|M
|-
|align="center" rowspan="1"|2014
|"Pretend Believe" single
|HOLYCHILD
|M
|-
|align="center" rowspan="1"|2014
|Shatter Me
|Lindsey Stirling
|M (2 tracks) 
|-
|align="center" rowspan="1"|2013
|Violent Light
|Milagres
|M
|-
|align="center" rowspan="1"|2013
|In Blue|The Static Jacks
|P, E, M
|-
|align="center" rowspan="1"|2013
|Vancouver|DIAZ
|P, E, M
|-
|align="center" rowspan="1"|2012
|Kids in L.A.|Kisses
|M
|-
|align="center" rowspan="1"|2013
|"A Real Hero" single
|High Highs
|M
|-
|align="center" rowspan="1"|2012
|Vol. I & Vol. II|HINTS
|P, E, M
|-
|align="center" rowspan="1"|2012
|Valerie + The Big Ship 7"
|Ra Ra Riot / Delicate Steve
|E, M
|-
|align="center" rowspan="1"|2012
|Remembrance of things to Come|Princeton
|E, M
|-
|align="center" rowspan="1"|2011
|"Some Boys (RAC Maury Mix)" 
|Death Cab for Cutie
|Remix
|-
|align="center" rowspan="1"|2011
|Massachusetts 2010|Mathieu Santos
|P, E, M
|-
|align="center" rowspan="1"|2010
|The Orchard 
|Ra Ra Riot
|P, E
|-
|align="center" rowspan="1"|2010
|The Heart of the Nightlife|Kisses
|P, M
|-
|align="center" rowspan="1"|2010
|Warship|The House Floor
|E, M
|-
|align="center" rowspan="1"|2010
|Sainthood|Tegan and Sara
|Logic Operator
|-
|align="center" rowspan="1"|2009
|Laces''
|The Static Jacks
|P, E, M
|}

RAC
From 2008 to 2013, Maury was a contributing member of RAC and has been creating remixes since 2007 for dozens of artists such as Surfer Blood, The Static Jacks, Death Cab for Cutie, Lenka, Clubfeet, Lacrymosa, Jukebox the Ghost, Tokyo Police Club, and Phoenix.

Notes

External links
Andrew Maury website

Record producers from New York (state)
Living people
Remixers
Year of birth missing (living people)
Place of birth missing (living people)
Musicians from New York City